Tuxpan Fútbol Club is a Mexican football club that plays in the Tercera División de México. The club is based in Tuxpan, Veracruz. In 2019, the club was refounded and renamed as Tuxpan F.C.. It is a rival of C.D. Poza Rica.

Stadium
The team plays its home games at the Estadio Álvaro Lorenzo Fernández, which has a capacity to accommodate 5,000 spectators.

Players

First-team squad

See also
Football in Mexico
Veracruz

References

External links
Official Page

Football clubs in Veracruz